Golden Earring is the self-titled album by Dutch rock band Golden Earring, released in 1970. Fans often refer to it as Wall of Dolls due to the cover artwork. This is the first Golden Earring album with drummer Cesar Zuiderwijk as a member. From that time, all four members of the band on this album have remained in the lineup.

Track listing
All songs written by Kooymans except where noted.

"Yellow and Blue" – 3:43
"The Loner" – 3:28
"This Is the Time of the Year" – 3:32
"Big Tree, Blue Sea" (Hay, Kooymans) – 6:09
"The Wall of Dolls" (Gerritsen, Hay) – 3:31
"Back Home" – 3:50
"See See" (Hay) – 3:10
"I'm Going to Send My Pigeons to the Sky" – 5:57
"As Long As the Wind Blows" – 5:20

Personnel
Barry Hay – flute, rhythm guitar, vocals; lead vocals (tracks 2, 4-8)
George Kooymans – lead guitar, vocals; lead vocals (tracks 1, 3, 9)
Rinus Gerritsen – bass, piano, organ, Mellotron
Cesar Zuiderwijk – drums, percussion

Production
Producer: Fred Haayen
Engineer: Albert Kos
Photography: Claude Van Heye

Charts

References

Golden Earring albums
1970 albums
Polydor Records albums